Roper Mountain Science Center is located in Greenville, South Carolina.  It encompasses a campus containing facilities for studying life and natural sciences, space and physical sciences.  Among its facilities are the Living History Farm, the Darrell W. Harrison Hall of Natural Sciences, the Simms Hall of Science, the T.C. Hooper Planetarium, and the Daniel Observatory.  The center is a part of the Greenville County School District.

History 
Roper Mountain Science Center was started as a unique partnership between public and private resources.  Initial planning for the center began in 1982 and the center opened in 1985.

Charles E. Daniel Observatory

The principal telescope at the observatory is a  refracting telescope. the objective lens was made by Alvan Clark and Sons. The telescope, which was finished in 1882, was installed at the Halsted Observatory of Princeton University. The telescope was rebuilt in 1933 by J. W. Fecker Company. The telescope was transferred to the US Naval Observatory in 1964. In 1968, it was offered to the Greenville County School District. The telescope was renovated and an observatory was built through a donation from the Charles E. Daniel Family Foundation. It is the eighth largest refractor telescope in the United States.

References

External links 
 

Buildings and structures in Greenville, South Carolina
Education in Greenville, South Carolina
Protected areas of Greenville County, South Carolina
Planetaria in the United States
Tourist attractions in Greenville, South Carolina
Museums in Greenville County, South Carolina
Farm museums in the United States
Science museums in South Carolina